This is a comprehensive listing of official releases by Lynn Davis, an American R&B singer. Although she has not recorded a solo album, she has recorded a The George Duke Band. She has a total of ten singles.

As one of the most popular and recorded session singers, she has contributed background vocals for many singers including George Duke, Deniece Williams, Toshinobu Kubota, Eros Ramazzotti, Howard Hewett, Mick Jagger, Jeffrey Osborne, and many other singers. She also wrote and vocally produced many of the songs for Patrice Rushen, Tracie Spencer, Susaye Greene, Thomas Anders, and Ana Rodríguez.

Albums

Studio albums

Live albums

Singles

Album appearances

Soundtrack appearances

Background vocal appearances

Video releases

Notes

References

External links
 
 
 

Discographies of American artists
Pop music discographies
Rhythm and blues discographies